Július Jakoby (born as Gyula Jakoby, Košice, Kingdom of Hungary, 28 March 1903 – Košice, Czechoslovak Socialist Republic, 15 April 1985) was a Slovak painter of Hungarian ancestry. Jakoby was a prominent figure of Slovakia's modernist art.

His image is that of a loner, living on the fringe of society, struggling for survival at the start of his career. His work is deeply tied to the small town atmosphere of Košice and its people, whose macrocosm can be seen in most of his works. In formal terms his work reflects secessionist expressionism and symbolism of Konštantín Kövári-Kačmárik and the Hungarian symbolism of Károly Férenczy and József Rippl-Rónai.

The works of Július Jakoby are exhibited in Slovak national gallery, National Gallery in Prague and Hungarian National Gallery and in many Slovak art museums and private collections. The biggest collection of his work is held in East Slovak Gallery in Košice.

His achievements are commemorated by a statue in the centre of his hometown of Košice, where he spent most of his life.

References

External links
 Hundred Years of Artistic Solitude. Thoughts on the Occasion of the 100th Anniversary of Gyula Jakoby’s Birth (in Hungarian)
 Artist profile on Artportal
 Works held in Slovak art collections

Artists from Košice
1903 births
1985 deaths
20th-century Hungarian painters
Hungarian male painters
Czechoslovak painters
20th-century Hungarian male artists